Demetrius son of Pythonax, surnamed Pheidon, was one of the Hetairoi  of Alexander. In 327 BC, when the King attempted to introduce proskynesis, Demetrius is alleged to have alerted Alexander to Callisthenes' opposition. He is described as a flatterer  of Alexander.

References
Arrian, Anab. iv. 12 ; Plut. Alex. 54.
Who's Who in the Age of Alexander the Great by Waldemar Heckel 

Hetairoi
Ancient Macedonian generals